Miriam Kanarek Donegan (born 1932) is an American former professional tennis player.

Originally from Nicaragua, Kanarek moved to Brooklyn, New York as 13-year old and came to the sport late, first picking up a racket when she was 16. She featured in the singles main draw of the 1968 US Open and lost a close first round match to Frances MacLennan, 9–11 in the third set. Outside of her playing career she was also involved in running local tennis facilities, including The River Tennis Club in Hastings, New York.

References

External links
  (wrong age)

1932 births
Living people
American female tennis players
Nicaraguan emigrants to the United States
Tennis people from New York (state)
Sportspeople from Brooklyn